James Sweeney (1901–1957) was an American film editor.

Sweeney was born in Illinois and started his Hollywood career in 1929. After starting as a film editor for Columbia, including a number of Three Stooges short subjects, Sweeney spent most of the rest of his career on Columbia features and programmers. He was active through 1957, and worked on about 100 films and some early television series.

Filmography
 Shadow Ranch, 1930
 The Dawn Trail (1930)
 The Lone Rider (1930)
 The Lightning Flyer (1931)
 Woman Haters, 1934 (the first Three Stooges short)
 Three Little Pigskins, 1934 (Three Stooges short)
 Horses' Collars, 1935 (Three Stooges short)
 Hoi Polloi, 1935 (Three Stooges short)
 Pop Goes the Easel, 1935 (Three Stooges short)
 Pardon My Scotch, 1935 (Three Stooges short)
 Killer at Large (1936)
 Trapped by Television, 1936
 Venus Makes Trouble, 1937
 Smashing the Spy Ring (1938)
 Parents on Trial (1939)
 Beware Spooks! (1939)
 So You Won't Talk, 1940
 Atlantic Convoy 1942
 Is Everybody Happy?, 1943
The Return of Rusty (1946)
 Last of the Redmen (1947)
 Best Man Wins, 1948
 Rusty Leads the Way (1948)
 Mary Ryan, Detective, 1949
Prison Warden (1949)
 The Blazing Sun, (1950)
 Flame of Stamboul (1951)
 The Hills of Utah (1951)
 The Old West (1952)
 Winning of the West, 1953
 Gun Fury, 1953
 The Incredible Petrified World, 1958

References

External links 
 

1901 births
1957 deaths
Place of death missing
People from Illinois
American film editors